The Psychotropic Substances Act of 1978 amended the Comprehensive Drug Abuse Prevention and Control Act of 1970 and Controlled Substances Act to ensure compliance with the Convention on Psychotropic Substances.  notes, "It is the intent of the Congress that the amendments made by this Act, together with existing law, will enable the United States to meet all of its obligations under the Convention and that no further legislation will be necessary for that purpose." The Psychotropic Substances Act created mechanisms by which the U.S. Government would add substances to the Schedules of controlled substances as required by the Convention. It also established a framework for exercising the U.S.'s rights to influence drug scheduling at the international level. The Secretary of Health and Human Services was given the power to make scheduling recommendations that would be binding on the U.S. representative in discussions and negotiations related to drug scheduling proposals before the Commission on Narcotic Drugs.

The Act viewed the regulations of Schedules IV and V of the Controlled Substances Act as being adequate to fulfill the minimum treaty obligations in the event of a disagreement between the U.S. and the U.N. on drug scheduling.

The S. 2399 legislation was passed by the 95th U.S. Congressional session and enacted into law by the 39th President of the United States Jimmy Carter on November 10, 1978.

References

External links
 21 U.S.C. § 801a. Congressional Findings and Declarations: Psychotropic Substances
 21 U.S.C. § 811. Authority and criteria for classification of substances
 
 

1978 in law
95th United States Congress
United States federal controlled substances legislation